Jack Revie was an association football coach.

He founded and coached the YMCA football club in Brisbane.

In 1949, he coached the Australian national team for one game against Hajduk Split. The match ended in a 3–0 loss for Australia. He coached the Queensland representative side in 1950.

References

Australia national soccer team managers
Year of birth missing
Year of death missing
Australian soccer coaches